"Drinkin' Problem" is the debut song of the American country music band Midland. It was released on February 27, 2017, as the first single from their debut album On the Rocks. The band members wrote the song with Josh Osborne and Shane McAnally, both of whom produced it with Dann Huff.

Critical reception
Taste of Country reviewed the song with favor, saying that "The trio’s 'Drinkin’ Problem' keeps the pretty of old-school country swing but dives dark into sorrow with no shame."

Commercial performance
"Drinkin' Problem" was certified Gold by the RIAA on August 16, 2017, and Platinum on January 18, 2019, and double Platinum on September 10, 2019.

Music video
The song's music video, directed by group member Cameron Duddy, was shot in Lockhart, Texas. It features the band selling moonshine.

Personnel
Adapted from On the Rocks liner notes.

Jess Carson - acoustic guitar, background vocals
Dan Dugmore - steel guitar
Cameron Duddy - bass guitar, background vocals
Ian Fitchuk - piano
Paul Franklin - steel guitar solo
Dann Huff - electric guitar, 12-string guitar, Hammond B-3 organ
Greg Morrow - drums
Danny Rader - acoustic guitar, mandolin, bouzouki
Derek Wells - electric guitar
Mark Wystrach - lead vocals

Charts

Year-end charts

Certifications

References

2017 debut singles
Big Machine Records singles
Songs written by Jess Carson
Songs written by Cameron Duddy
Songs written by Shane McAnally
Songs written by Josh Osborne
Songs written by Mark Wystrach
Song recordings produced by Shane McAnally
Midland (band) songs
Song recordings produced by Dann Huff
2017 songs
Music videos directed by Cameron Duddy
Songs about alcohol